Rousselière is a surname. Notable people with the surname include:

 Charles Rousselière (1875–1950), French operatic tenor 
 Guy Mary-Rousselière (1913–1994), French-Canadian anthropologist and missionary priest